The Grove of Titans is a redwood grove in Del Norte County, Northern California, with several massive coast redwood (Sequoia sempervirens) trees, some of the largest known redwoods in terms of wood volume. The largest coastal redwood tree in the grove by volume is the single-stem Del Norte Titan. The Lost Monarch is comparably large, but a large sprout from the ground at its base is not part of the main trunk structure.

History
The unofficially named Grove of Titans was discovered May 11, 1998, by botanist Stephen Sillett, and naturalist Michael Taylor in Jedediah Smith Redwoods State Park. The discovery implies that Sillett and Taylor are the first to realize and declare the significance of the grove, not that they were the first ones ever to see it.

In approximately 2011, a person from Oregon learned of and posted the grove's geolocation online and a surge of visitors followed. The increased boot traffic triggered problems like damage to native plants, soil compaction, difficulty for scientists, and strain on limited park resources. Between 2012 and 2016, approximately 8000 sq.ft. of ferns, sorrel and other plants were destroyed by visitors. The native plant damage was most evident around a redwood called Screaming Titans. In July 2016 the parks posted a sign which states up to 3300 sq. meters impacted. 

Starting on Nov. 6, 2019, construction began on a 1,300-foot-long elevated walkway through the Grove of Titans. The trail segment and boardwalk opened with limited access in September 2021. The remaining 2 miles of the Mill Creek Trail renovation will be completed by early summer 2022. The project cost is $3.5 million and being paid for by a partnership including Save the Redwoods League, California State Parks, the National Park Service, and Redwood Parks Conservancy.

Flora
Names of the named largest redwoods in this grove include Lost Monarch, El Viejo del Norte, Screaming Titans, Eärendil and Elwing, Beregond, Aragorn, Sacajawea, Aldebaran, Stalagmight and Del Norte Titan.

Several abundant understory plants are California sword fern – Polystichum munitum and Redwood sorrel – Oxalis oregana.

Location
The Grove of Titans is in Jedediah Smith Redwoods State Park of Northern California, off Howland Hill Road south of Highway 199. The closest town is Crescent City, California. The location was described by author Richard Preston in his 2007 book The Wild Trees as "the bottom of a hidden notch-like valley near a glade."  The exact location was not revealed in this book for fear that excessive traffic.

See also
Redwood National and State Parks

References

External links
Grove of Titans Information Extensive Information, History and Narrative about Grove of Titans.
The Wild Trees by Richard Preston: excerpt in Orion, "Day of Discovery"  How the grove was discovered.
NPR program Day to Day with the author, Richard Preston - published 04-23-2007

Redwood National and State Parks
Protected areas of Del Norte County, California
Individual coast redwood trees